Ignacio Izaguirre (26 September 1896 – 12 December 1974) was a Spanish athlete. He competed in the men's shot put and the men's javelin throw at the 1920 Summer Olympics.

References

1896 births
1974 deaths
Athletes (track and field) at the 1920 Summer Olympics
Spanish male shot putters
Spanish male javelin throwers
Olympic athletes of Spain
Place of birth missing
Athletes from the Basque Country (autonomous community)
People from Elgoibar
Sportspeople from Gipuzkoa